The 1990 Stanford Cardinal baseball team represented Stanford University in the 1990 NCAA Division I baseball season. The Cardinal played their home games at Sunken Diamond. The team was coached by Mark Marquess in his 14th year at Stanford.

The Cardinal won the Pacific-10 Conference South Division and the West I Regional to advanced to the College World Series, where they were defeated by the Georgia Bulldogs.

Roster

Schedule 

! style="" | Regular Season
|- valign="top" 

|- align="center" bgcolor="#ccffcc"
| 1 || January 26 || at  || Stephen Schott Stadium • Santa Clara, California || 6–0 || 1–0 || –
|- align="center" bgcolor="#ccffcc"
| 2 || January 28 || Santa Clara || Sunken Diamond • Stanford, California || 6–4 || 2–0 || –
|- align="center" bgcolor="#ccffcc"
| 3 || January 31 ||  || Sunken Diamond • Stanford, California || 15–5 || 3–0 || –
|-

|- align="center" bgcolor="#ccffcc"
| 4 || February 2 ||  || Sunken Diamond • Stanford, California || 8–1 || 4–0 || –
|- align="center" bgcolor="#ccffcc"
| 5 || February 3 || Cal State Fullerton || Sunken Diamond • Stanford, California || 1–0 || 5–0 || –
|- align="center" bgcolor="#ccffcc"
| 6 || February 4 || Cal State Fullerton || Sunken Diamond • Stanford, California || 8–7 || 6–0 || –
|- align="center" bgcolor="#ffcccc"
| 7 || February 5 ||  || Sunken Diamond • Stanford, California || 1–9 || 6–1 || –
|- align="center" bgcolor="#ffcccc"
| 8 || February 9 || at  || Rainbow Stadium • Honolulu, Hawaii || 12–6 || 7–1 || –
|- align="center" bgcolor="#ccffcc"
| 9 || February 10 || at Hawaii || Rainbow Stadium • Honolulu, Hawaii || 11–2 || 8–1 || –
|- align="center" bgcolor="#ccffcc"
| 10 || February 11 || at Hawaii || Rainbow Stadium • Honolulu, Hawaii || 8–2 || 9–1 || –
|- align="center" bgcolor="#ccffcc"
| 11 || February 13 ||  || Sunken Diamond • Stanford, California || 4–3 || 10–1 || –
|- align="center" bgcolor="#ccffcc"
| 12 || February 18 || at  || Jackie Robinson Stadium • Los Angeles, California || 16–5 || 11–1 || 1–0
|- align="center" bgcolor="#ffcccc"
| 13 || February 19 || at UCLA || Jackie Robinson Stadium • Los Angeles, California || 3–5 || 11–2 || 1–1
|- align="center" bgcolor="#ccffcc"
| 14 || February 19 || at UCLA || Jackie Robinson Stadium • Los Angeles, California || 6–5 || 12–2 || 2–1
|- align="center" bgcolor="#ffcccc"
| 15 || February 20 ||  || Sunken Diamond • Stanford, California || 5–6 || 12–3 || 2–1
|- align="center" bgcolor="#ffcccc"
| 16 || February 23 || at  || Dedeaux Field • Los Angeles, California || 3–5 || 12–4 || 2–2
|- align="center" bgcolor="#ccffcc"
| 17 || February 24 || at Southern California || Dedeaux Field • Los Angeles, California || 5–2 || 13–4 || 3–2
|- align="center" bgcolor="#ffcccc"
| 18 || February 25 || at Southern California || Dedeaux Field • Los Angeles, California || 14–5 || 13–5 || 3–3
|- align="center" bgcolor="#ccffcc"
| 19 || February 26 ||  || Sunken Diamond • Stanford, California || 19–3 || 14–5 || 3–3
|- align="center" bgcolor="#ccffcc"
| 20 || February 27 ||  || Sunken Diamond • Stanford, California || 6–5 || 15–5 || 3–3
|-

|- align="center" bgcolor="#ccffcc"
| 21 || March 3 ||  || Sunken Diamond • Stanford, California || 3–2 || 16–5 || 4–3
|- align="center" bgcolor="#ccffcc"
| 22 || March 5 || Arizona State || Sunken Diamond • Stanford, California || 14–8 || 17–5 || 5–3
|- align="center" bgcolor="#ccffcc"
| 23 || March 6 || Santa Clara || Sunken Diamond • Stanford, California || 9–5 || 18–5 || 5–3
|- align="center" bgcolor="#ccffcc"
| 24 || March 9 ||  || Sunken Diamond • Stanford, California || 8–2 || 19–5 || 6–3
|- align="center" bgcolor="#ccffcc"
| 25 || March 10 || Arizona || Sunken Diamond • Stanford, California || 7–4 || 20–5 || 7–3
|- align="center" bgcolor="#ccffcc"
| 26 || March 11 || Arizona || Sunken Diamond • Stanford, California || 8–2 || 21–5 || 8–3
|- align="center" bgcolor="#ccffcc"
| 27 || March 24 || at  || Pete Beiden Field at Bob Bennett Stadium • Fresno, California || 9–2 || 22–5 || 8–3
|- align="center" bgcolor="#ffcccc"
| 28 || March 25 || at Fresno State || Pete Beiden Field at Bob Bennett Stadium • Fresno, California || 3–4 || 22–6 || 8–3
|- align="center" bgcolor="#ccffcc"
| 29 || March 26 || at Fresno State || Pete Beiden Field at Bob Bennett Stadium • Fresno, California || 5–3 || 23–6 || 8–3
|- align="center" bgcolor="#ccffcc"
| 30 || March 29 || at  || Blair Field • Long Beach, California || 12–8 || 24–6 || 8–3
|- align="center" bgcolor="#ccffcc"
| 31 || March 30 || at  || Hubert H. Humphrey Metrodome • Minneapolis, Minnesota || 10–4 || 25–6 || 8–3
|- align="center" bgcolor="#ccffcc"
| 32 || March 31 || vs  || Hubert H. Humphrey Metrodome • Minneapolis, Minnesota || 10–1 || 26–6 || 8–3
|-

|- align="center" bgcolor="#ffcccc"
| 33 || April 1 || vs  || Hubert H. Humphrey Metrodome • Minneapolis, Minnesota || 3–4 || 26–7 || 8–3
|- align="center" bgcolor="#ccffcc"
| 34 || April 3 ||  || Sunken Diamond • Stanford, California || 16–2 || 27–7 || 8–3
|- align="center" bgcolor="#ccffcc"
| 35 || April 6 || UCLA || Sunken Diamond • Stanford, California || 6–1 || 28–7 || 9–3
|- align="center" bgcolor="#ccffcc"
| 36 || April 7 || UCLA || Sunken Diamond • Stanford, California || 9–7 || 29–7 || 10–3
|- align="center" bgcolor="#ccffcc"
| 37 || April 8 || UCLA || Sunken Diamond • Stanford, California || 11–8 || 30–7 || 11–3
|- align="center" bgcolor="#ccffcc"
| 38 || April 9 || at San Jose State || San Jose Municipal Stadium • San Jose, California || 6–5 || 31–7 || 11–3
|- align="center" bgcolor="#ccffcc"
| 39 || April 12 ||  || Sunken Diamond • Stanford, California || 11–1 || 32–7 || 12–3
|- align="center" bgcolor="#ccffcc"
| 40 || April 13 || at California || Evans Diamond • Berkeley, California || 14–9 || 33–7 || 13–3
|- align="center" bgcolor="#ccffcc"
| 41 || April 14 || California || Sunken Diamond • Stanford, California || 11–9 || 34–7 || 14–3
|- align="center" bgcolor="#ccffcc"
| 42 || April 17 || at Santa Clara || Buck Shaw Stadium • Santa Clara, California || 10–3 || 35–7 || 14–3
|- align="center" bgcolor="#ccffcc"
| 43 || April 20 || at Arizona || Jerry Kindall Field at Frank Sancet Stadium • Tucson, Arizona || 5–3 || 36–7 || 15–3
|- align="center" bgcolor="#ccffcc"
| 44 || April 21 || at Arizona || Jerry Kindall Field at Frank Sancet Stadium • Tucson, Arizona || 9–3 || 37–7 || 16–3
|- align="center" bgcolor="#ccffcc"
| 45 || April 22 || at Arizona || Jerry Kindall Field at Frank Sancet Stadium • Tucson, Arizona || 13–5 || 38–7 || 17–3
|- align="center" bgcolor="#ccffcc"
| 46 || April 23 ||  || Sunken Diamond • Stanford, California || 14–8 || 39–7 || 17–3
|- align="center" bgcolor="#ccffcc"
| 47 || April 24 || at San Francisco || Dante Benedetti Diamond at Max Ulrich Field • San Francisco, California || 13–0 || 40–7 || 17–3
|- align="center" bgcolor="#ccffcc"
| 48 || April 27 || at Arizona State || Packard Stadium • Tempe, Arizona || 10–9 || 41–7 || 18–3
|- align="center" bgcolor="#ffcccc"
| 49 || April 27 || at Arizona State || Packard Stadium • Tempe, Arizona || 1–16 || 41–8 || 18–4
|- align="center" bgcolor="#ccffcc"
| 50 || April 28 || at Arizona State || Packard Stadium • Tempe, Arizona || 10–7 || 42–8 || 19–4
|- align="center" bgcolor="#ffcccc"
| 51 || April 29 || at Arizona State || Packard Stadium • Tempe, Arizona || 6–13 || 42–9 || 19–5
|-

|- align="center" bgcolor="#ccffcc"
| 52 || May 1 || at Saint Mary's || Louis Guisto Field • Moraga, California || 10–3 || 43–9 || 19–5
|- align="center" bgcolor="#ccffcc"
| 53 || May 4 || at California || Evans Diamond • Berkeley, California || 15–9 || 44–9 || 20–5
|- align="center" bgcolor="#ccffcc"
| 54 || May 5 || California || Sunken Diamond • Stanford, California || 15–1 || 45–9 || 21–5
|- align="center" bgcolor="#ccffcc"
| 55 || May 6 || at California || Evans Diamond • Berkeley, California || 3–2 || 46–9 || 22–5
|- align="center" bgcolor="#ccffcc"
| 56 || May 8 || at  || Maloney Field • San Francisco, California || 10–6 || 47–9 || 22–5
|- align="center" bgcolor="#ccffcc"
| 57 || May 11 || Southern California || Sunken Diamond • Stanford, California || 2–1 || 48–9 || 23–5
|- align="center" bgcolor="#ffcccc"
| 58 || May 12 || Southern California || Sunken Diamond • Stanford, California || 2–3 || 48–10 || 23–6
|- align="center" bgcolor="#ccffcc"
| 59 || May 13 || Southern California || Sunken Diamond • Stanford, California || 6–1 || 49–10 || 24–6
|- align="center" bgcolor="#ccffcc"
| 60 || May 18 ||  || Sunken Diamond • Stanford, California || 6–2 || 50–10 || 24–6
|- align="center" bgcolor="#ccffcc"
| 61 || May 19 || UC Santa Barbara || Sunken Diamond • Stanford, California || 6–4 || 51–10 || 24–6
|- align="center" bgcolor="#ccffcc"
| 62 || May 20 || UC Santa Barbara || Sunken Diamond • Stanford, California || 13–11 || 52–10 || 24–6
|-

|-
|-
! style="" | Postseason
|- valign="top"

|- align="center" bgcolor="#ccffcc"
| 63 || May 24 ||  || Sunken Diamond • Stanford, California || 7–0 || 53–10 || 24–6
|- align="center" bgcolor="#ccffcc"
| 64 || May 25 ||  || Sunken Diamond • Stanford, California || 6–1 || 54–10 || 24–6
|- align="center" bgcolor="#ccffcc"
| 65 || May 26 ||  || Sunken Diamond • Stanford, California || 6–2 || 55–10 || 24–6
|- align="center" bgcolor="#ccffcc"
| 66 || May 28 || San Diego State || Sunken Diamond • Stanford, California || 6–2 || 56–10 || 24–6
|-

|- align="center" bgcolor="#ccffcc"
| 67 || June 1 || vs  || Johnny Rosenblatt Stadium • Omaha, Nebraska || 5–4 || 57–10 || 24–6
|- align="center" bgcolor="#ffcccc"
| 68 || June 3 || vs Georgia || Johnny Rosenblatt Stadium • Omaha, Nebraska || 2–16 || 57–11 || 24–6
|- align="center" bgcolor="#ccffcc"
| 69 || June 5 || vs  || Johnny Rosenblatt Stadium • Omaha, Nebraska || 6–1 || 58–11 || 24–6
|- align="center" bgcolor="#ccffcc"
| 70 || June 6 || vs Georgia || Johnny Rosenblatt Stadium • Omaha, Nebraska || 4–2 || 59–11 || 24–6
|- align="center" bgcolor="#ffcccc"
| 71 || June 8 || vs Georgia || Johnny Rosenblatt Stadium • Omaha, Nebraska || 1–5 || 59–12 || 24–6
|-

Awards and honors 
Paul Carey
 All-Pac-10 South Division
 Second Team All-American Baseball America

Tim Griffin
 All-Pac-10 South Division
 Second Team All-American Baseball America

Jeffrey Hammonds
 All-Pac-10 South Division
 First Team All-American Baseball America
 First Team All-American The Sports Network
 First Team Freshman All-American Baseball America
 Freshman of the Year Baseball America
 Freshman of the Year Collegiate Baseball
 College World Series All-Tournament Team

Troy Paulsen
 All-Pac-10 South Division
 College World Series All-Tournament Team

Brian Sackinsky
 Second Team Freshman All-American Baseball America

Stan Spencer
 All-Pac-10 South Division
 First Team All-American American Baseball Coaches Association
 First Team All-American Baseball America
 First Team All-American The Sports Network

References 

Stanford Cardinal baseball seasons
Stanford Cardinal baseball
College World Series seasons
Stanford
Pac-12 Conference baseball champion seasons